Akor Jerome Adams (born 29 January 2000) is a Nigerian professional footballer who plays as a forward for Eliteserien club Lillestrøm.

Club career
In August 2018, he joined Norwegian side Sogndal from Jamba Football Academy in Nigeria. He made his debut for the club on 28 August 2018. He missed much of the 2020 season due to injury. His contract with Sogndal expired at the end of the 2021 season. He ended the season with 10 goals in 28 games. On 2 December 2021, he signed a three-year contract with Lillestrøm. He made his competitive debut in the cup, scoring against Nardo; and then his Eliteserien debut on 2 April 2022 against HamKam, scoring one of the goals in a 2–2 draw.

International career
Adams featured for the Nigeria under-20 team at the 2019 FIFA U-20 World Cup.

Career statistics

References

External links

2000 births
Living people
Nigerian footballers
Nigeria under-20 international footballers
Sogndal Fotball players
Lillestrøm SK players
Norwegian First Division players
Eliteserien players
Nigerian expatriate footballers
Nigerian expatriate sportspeople in Norway
Expatriate footballers in Norway
Association football forwards